Toludesvenlafaxine, also formerly known as ansofaxine and sold under the brand name Ruoxinlin, is an antidepressant which is approved for the treatment of major depressive disorder in China. It is also under development for use in other countries like the United States. It is a serotonin–norepinephrine–dopamine reuptake inhibitor (SNDRI) and was developed by Luye Pharma Group.

Toludesvenlafaxine is described as an SNDRI and prodrug to desvenlafaxine. However, unlike desvenlafaxine, which has in vitro  values of 53 nM and 538 nM for inhibition of serotonin and norepinephrine reuptake, respectively, toludesvenlafaxine has respective in vitro IC50 values of 723 nM, 763 nM, and 491 nM for serotonin, norepinephrine, and dopamine reuptake inhibition. As such, toludesvenlafaxine appears to be a more balanced reuptake inhibitor of serotonin, norepinephrine, and dopamine than desvenlafaxine.

As of July 2018, toludesvenlafaxine is in preregistration for the treatment of depression in the United States, the European Union, and Japan. As of January 2023, it is also in phase 3 clinical trials for the treatment of generalized anxiety disorder. In March 2020, the United States Food and Drug Administration accepted Luye Pharma's New Drug Application for toludesvenlafaxine, which remains under review. In November 2022, toludesvenlafaxine was approved for the treatment of depression in China under the brand name Ruoxinlin.

References

External links
 Toludesvenlafaxine extended release - AdisInsight

Antidepressants
Cyclohexanols
Phenethylamines
Phenols
Serotonin–norepinephrine–dopamine reuptake inhibitors
Tertiary alcohols